Foxton is an unincorporated community in Jefferson County, Colorado, United States. The U.S. Post Office at Conifer (ZIP Code 80433) now serves Foxton postal addresses.

Geography
Foxton is located at  (39.4244333, -105.2361032).

References

Unincorporated communities in Jefferson County, Colorado
Unincorporated communities in Colorado
Denver metropolitan area